Gavin O'Brien (born 10 March 1993) is an Irish hurler who currently plays as a left corner-forward for the Waterford senior team.

O'Brien made his first appearance for the team during the 2012 National League and became a Waterford regular during the 2012 championship. A former member of the Waterford minor team, he is also a member of the Waterford under-21 team.

At club level O'Brien plays with Roanmore. He plays in a centre forward role or a midfield role for his club. Gavin is a very consistent free taker who can score from a dead ball from as far out as his own 45.

References

1993 births
Living people
Roanmore hurlers
Waterford inter-county hurlers
Waterford IT hurlers